ŠK Bernolákovo is a Slovak football team, based in the town of Bernolákovo. The club was founded in 1912.

External links 
Official club website 

Football clubs in Slovakia
SK Bernolakovo
1912 establishments in Slovakia